Leucographus catalai is a species of beetle in the family Cerambycidae. It was described by Villiers in 1939.

References

Crossotini
Beetles described in 1939